Merrifield is a census-designated place (CDP) in Fairfax County, Virginia, United States. The population was 15,212 at the 2010 census.

Geography

Merrifield is located in eastern Fairfax County at  (38.873144, −77.242994). It is bounded by I-66 on the north, the Capital Beltway on the east, Arlington Boulevard (U.S. Route 50) on the south, and Nutley Street (Virginia State Highway 243) on the west. Neighboring communities are Oakton to the west, the town of Vienna to the north, Dunn Loring to the northeast, Idylwood and West Falls Church to the east, Annandale at the southeast corner of Merrifield, Woodburn and Mantua to the south, and the city of Fairfax to the southwest.

Demographics
As of the census of 2000, there were 11,170 people, 4,396 households, and 2,725 families residing in the CDP. The racial makeup of the CDP was 54.67% White, 5.94% African American, 0.25% Native American, 29.94% Asian, 0.10% Pacific Islander, 5.00% from other races, and 4.11% from two or more races. Hispanic or Latino of any race were 12.91% of the population.

There were 4,396 households, out of which 28.1% had children under the age of 18 living with them, 48.7% were married couples living together, 8.8% had a female householder with no husband present, and 38.0% were non-families. 25.0% of all households were made up of individuals, and 3.5% had someone living alone who was 65 years of age or older. The average household size was 2.54 and the average family size was 3.06.

In the CDP, the population was spread out, with 19.4% under the age of 18, 10.3% from 18 to 24, 42.7% from 25 to 44, 21.4% from 45 to 64, and 6.2% who were 65 years of age or older. The median age was 33 years. For every 100 females, there were 102.4 males. For every 100 females age 18 and over, there were 103.3 males.

The median income for a household in the CDP was $70,363, and the median income for a family was $74,116. Males had a median income of $55,653 versus $43,095 for females. The per capita income for the CDP was $32,819. About 5.3% of families and 7.4% of the population were below the poverty line, including 11.5% of those under age 18 and 5.8% of those age 65 or over.

Education
Fairfax County Public Schools operates public schools. The FCPS headquarters are located in the Gatehouse Administration Center within the Merrifield CDP.

See also

 Dunn Loring station

References

Census-designated places in Fairfax County, Virginia
Census-designated places in Virginia
Washington metropolitan area